State Route 207 (SR 207) is a primary state highway in the U.S. state of Virginia.  Known for most of its length as Rogers Clark Boulevard, the state highway runs  from U.S. Route 1 (US 1) in Ruther Glen east to US 301 and SR 2 in Bowling Green.  SR 207 is a divided highway connection between Interstate 95 (I-95) north of Richmond and US 301, which heads toward Fort A.P. Hill, the Northern Neck, and the Potomac River Bridge to Southern Maryland.

Route description

SR 207 begins at an intersection with US 1 (Emancipation Highway) in Ruther Glen, in an area also known as Carmel Church, in western Caroline County.  The state highway heads east as Rogers Clark Boulevard, a four-lane divided highway that passes through a commercial area with services catering to travellers.  Within the commercial area, SR 207 has a partial cloverleaf interchange with I-95.  East of Ruther Glen, the state highway heads northeast toward Bowling Green.  SR 207 crosses over CSX's RF&P Subdivision railroad line and the Mattaponi River north of the village of Milford.  Southwest of Bowling Green, the state highway meets the western end of SR 207 Business, which takes the name Rogers Clark Boulevard toward the town of Bowling Green.  SR 207 continues east as the Bowling Green Bypass to the route's eastern terminus.  The state highway crosses over US 301 and SR 2 (Richmond Turnpike) and ends at a two-way ramp between the north–south road and the bypass.  The Bowling Green Bypass continues northeast as US 301 toward Fort A.P. Hill.  The two-way ramp, which is part of US 301, leads to the Richmond Turnpike, which heads south toward Richmond as US 301 and SR 2 and north into the town of Bowling Green as SR 2 and US 301 Business.

History

Under a previous numbering system, SR 207 was known as State Route 613 from 1929-1933. This SR 613 initially ran only from US 1 at Carmel Church to the Mattaponi River but, in 1930-31, was extended east to the current US 301 Business and SR 2 intersection in Bowling Green. The route was renumbered in 1933 as SR 207, which itself had been a previous designation of part of what is now SR 24 near Roanoke. In addition to the current path of SR 207, the 1933 route included what is now SR 639 in Caroline County from Chilesburg to Ladysmith but this was renumbered as SR 229 by 1937. Part of this route had been SR 229 from 1933. In 1941, this new section became part of US 301 which it remains .

Major intersections

Bowling Green business route

State Route 207 Business (SR 207 Business) is a business route of SR 207 in Bowling Green. SR 207 Business heads northeast as Rogers Clark Boulevard and becomes Broaddus Avenue on entering the town limits of Bowling Green. The business route reaches its eastern terminus at SR 2 (Main Street). US 301 Business also heads south on Main Street and east on Broaddus Avenue to its northern end between Bowling Green and Fort A.P. Hill.

References

External links

Virginia Highways Project: VA 207

207
State Route 207
U.S. Route 301